was a Japanese josei manga magazine published by Shueisha, based in Tokyo and first published in 1986. It ran for 22 years before being cancelled in October 2005.  After the magazine's closure, Shueisha moved several series serialized in Young You to its sister magazines Chorus (now known as Cocohana) and You.

Notable mangakas and series serialized in Young You
 Naomi Akimoto
Ensemble
 Katei no Jijou
 Natural
 See You Again
 Uchi no Mama ga Iu Koto ni wa
 Ushirosugata no Cha Cha
 Yoru no Kumo Asa no Tsuki
 Nanae Haruno
Double House
 Papa Told Me
 Pietà
 Yukari Ichijo
Tadashii Renai no Susume
 Mariko Iwadate
Amaryllis
Alice ni Onegai
Bara no Hoo
Kirara no Ki
Reizouko ni Pineapple Pie
 Maki Kusumoto
Tanbi Seikatsu Hyakka
 Erica Sakurazawa
Love Vibes
 Shungicu Uchida
Kaiketsu wa Shimasen
 Chika Umino
 Honey and Clover
 Ebine Yamaji
Mahoko
 Otenki to Issho
 Mayumi Yoshida
Kushami San Kai

References

External links
  
 
 discontinuation announcement English translation of original article

Defunct magazines published in Japan
Monthly manga magazines published in Japan
Josei manga magazines
Magazines established in 1986
Magazines disestablished in 2005
Shueisha magazines
1986 establishments in Japan
2005 disestablishments in Japan
Magazines published in Tokyo